Pet insurance is a form of insurance that pays, partly or in total, for veterinary treatment of the insured person's ill or injured pet. Some policies will pay out when the pet dies, or if the pet is lost or stolen.

As veterinary medicine is increasingly employing expensive medical techniques and drugs, and owners have higher expectations for their pets' health care and standard of living than previously, the market for pet insurance has increased.

Exclusions from Pet Insurance 
The following are some of the general exclusions from most available pet insurance plans:

 Intentional or malicious harm to the pet
 Injury or illness caused by neglect or inexperienced pet handling
 Loss or harm caused by any form of war, rebellion, or insurrection
 Hereditary disorders 
 Developmental defects
 Death from rabies, distemper, viral hepatitis, viral enteritis, leptospirosis, and other diseases
 Illness contracted prior to purchasing the policy.
 Spaying or neutering, vaccinations, microchipping, ear or teeth cleanings, annual checkups

History 
The first pet insurance policy was written in 1890 in Sweden by Claes Virgin. Virgin was the founder of Länsförsäkrings Alliance, at that time he focused on horses and livestock. In 1947 the first pet insurance policy was sold in Britain. As of 2009, Britain had the second-highest level of pet insurance in the world (23%), behind only Sweden. According to the latest data available from the U.S. Department of Clinical Veterinary Science and the Pet Food Institute, only 0.7% of pets in the United States are covered by Pet Insurance. In 1982, the first pet insurance policy was sold in the United States, and issued to television's Lassie by Veterinary Pet Insurance (VPI).

How policies work 
Pet insurance is a form of property insurance rather than health insurance. As such, pet insurance reimburses the owner after the pet has received care and the owner submits a claim to the insurance company. Pet insurance policies primarily cover dogs, cats and horses though more exotic species of animal can obtain coverage.

UK policies may pay 100% of vets fees, but this is not always the case. It is common for UK pet insurance companies to discount their policies by offering customers the chance to pay an "excess", just as with motor insurance. Excess fees can range from £40 to £100.

Policies in the United States and Canada either pay off a benefit schedule or pay a percentage of the vet costs (70-100%), after reaching a deductible, depending on the company and the policy. The owner usually pays the amount due to the veterinarian and then sends in the claim form and receives reimbursement, which some companies and policies limit according to their own schedules of necessary and usual charges. For very high bills, some veterinarians allow the owner to put off payment until the insurance claim is processed. Some insurers pay veterinarians directly on behalf of customers. Most American and Canadian policies require the pet owner to submit a request for fees incurred.

Previously, most pet insurance plans did not pay for preventative care (such as vaccinations) or elective procedures (such as neutering). Recently, however, some companies in Canada, the United Kingdom, and the United States are offering routine-care coverage, sometimes called comprehensive coverage. Dental care, prescription drugs, and alternative treatments, such as physiotherapy and acupuncture, are also covered by some providers.

There are two categories of insurance policies for pets: non-lifetime and lifetime. The first covers buyers for most conditions suffered by their pet during the course of a policy year but, on renewal in a following year, a condition that has been claimed for will be excluded. If that condition needs further treatment the pet owner will have to pay for that him/herself. The second category covers a pet for ongoing conditions throughout the pet’s lifetime so that, if a condition is claimed for in the first year, it will not be excluded in subsequent years. However, lifetime policies also have limits: some have limits "per condition", others have limits "per condition, per year", and others have limits "per year", all of which have different implications for a pet owner whose pet needs treatment year after year, so it is wise to be clear which type of lifetime policy you are considering.

In addition, companies often limit coverage for pre-existing conditions in order to eliminate fraudulent consumers, thus giving owners an incentive to insure even very young animals, who are not expected to incur high veterinary costs while they are still healthy.  There is usually a short period after a pet insurance policy is bought when the holder will be unable to claim for sickness, often no more than 14 days from inception. This is to cover illnesses contracted before the pet was covered but whose symptoms appeared only after coverage has begun.

Some insurers offer options not directly related to pet health, including covering boarding costs for animals whose owners are hospitalized, or costs (such as rewards or posters) associated with retrieving lost animals. Some policies also include travel cancellation coverage if owners must remain with pets who need urgent treatment or are dying.

Some British policies for dogs also include third-party liability insurance. Thus, for example, if a dog causes a car accident that damages a vehicle, the insurer will pay to rectify the damage for which the owner is responsible under the Animals Act 1971.

The difference between companies
Pet insurance companies are beginning to offer the pet owner more of an ability to customize their coverage by allowing them to choose their own level of deductible or co-insurance. This allows the pet owner to control their monthly premium and choose the level of coverage that suits them the best.

Some of the differences in insurance coverage are:
 Which pets are covered (typically dogs and cats, though some insurance companies cover horses or other pets.)
 Whether congenital and hereditary conditions (like hip dysplasia, heart defects, eye cataracts or diabetes) are covered;
 How the reimbursement is calculated (based on the actual vet bill, a benefit schedule or usual and customary rates);
 Whether the deductible is on a per-incident or an annual basis;
 Whether there are any limits or caps applied (per incident, per year, age or over the pet’s lifetime); and
 Whether there is an annual contract that determines anything diagnosed in the previous year of coverage is considered pre-existing the next year.

References

 
Insurance